Xenosaurus mendozai is a lizard found in Mexico.

References

Xenosauridae
Reptiles described in 2013
Reptiles of Mexico